Sir Kenneth MacMillan (11 December 192929 October 1992) was a British ballet dancer and choreographer who was artistic director of the Royal Ballet in London between 1970 and 1977, and its principal choreographer from 1977 until his death. Earlier he had served as director of ballet for the Deutsche Oper in Berlin. He was also associate director of the American Ballet Theatre from 1984 to 1989, and artistic associate of the Houston Ballet from 1989 to 1992.

From a family with no background of dance or music, MacMillan was determined from an early age to become a dancer. The director of Sadler's Wells Ballet, Ninette de Valois, accepted him as a student and then a member of her company. In the late 1940s, MacMillan built a successful career as a dancer, but, plagued by stage fright, he abandoned it while still in his twenties. After this he worked entirely as a choreographer; he created ten full-length ballets and more than fifty one-act pieces. In addition to his work for ballet companies he was active in television, musicals, non-musical drama, and opera.

Although he is mainly associated with the Royal Ballet, MacMillan frequently considered himself an outsider there and felt driven to work with other companies throughout his career as choreographer. His creations for the Stuttgart Ballet and the Deutsche Opera ballet include some of his most frequently revived works.

Life and career

Early years
MacMillan was born in Dunfermline, Scotland, the youngest of four surviving children of William MacMillan (1891–1946), who was a labourer and, from time to time, cook, and his wife, Edith ( Shreeve; 1888–1942). 

His father had served in the army in the First World War, and suffered permanent physical and mental damage. In search of work he moved with his family to his wife's home town, Great Yarmouth in Norfolk. After attending a local primary school, Kenneth studied from 1940 at Great Yarmouth Grammar School, to which he won a scholarship. As Great Yarmouth was a target for German air raids in the Second World War, the school was evacuated to Retford in Nottinghamshire.

In Retford, MacMillan was introduced to ballet by a local dance teacher, Jean Thomas. He had already had lessons in Scottish dancing in Dunfermline and tap dancing in Great Yarmouth, and he took to ballet immediately. In 1942, his mother died, which caused him acute and lasting distress. His father was a distant figure, and the boy's only close family relationship was with an elder sister. His obituarist in The Times suggests that the feeling of being an outsider, displayed in many of MacMillan's ballets, had its roots in his childhood.

When the grammar school returned to Great Yarmouth in 1944, MacMillan found a new ballet teacher, Phyllis Adams. With her help, MacMillan, aged fifteen, secured admission to the Sadler's Wells Ballet School (later the Royal Ballet School). He saw his first performances of ballets, given by Ninette de Valois' Sadler's Wells company, at the New Theatre in London.

Dancer

When David Webster was appointed chief executive of the Royal Opera House, Covent Garden at the end of the war, his assignment was to establish permanent opera and ballet companies for the house. He set about building the opera company from scratch but persuaded de Valois to make Covent Garden the main base for her ballet company. In 1946, while still a student, MacMillan appeared in the production of The Sleeping Beauty with which Webster and de Valois reopened the opera house. At first he was a non-dancing extra, and later he was promoted to a small dancing role. With the main company now resident at Covent Garden, de Valois established a smaller ensemble to perform at Sadler's Wells and act as a training ground for young dancers and choreographers. In April 1946 MacMillan was a founder member, and quickly made progress. He was cast by Frederick Ashton, de Valois' principal choreographer, in a leading role in a new ballet, Valses nobles et sentimentales, in October 1946. The success of the piece encouraged Ashton to revive his 1933 Les Rendezvous. 

Although initially only in the corps de ballet for this work, MacMillan was unexpectedly promoted to the male lead because of injuries to all the eligible company principals. His biographer Jann Parry comments that he was able to take over without notice because he had a rare ability to remember and reproduce the steps of every dancer in any piece in which he appeared. He was promoted to the senior Covent Garden company at the start of the 1948–49 season, touring in Europe and dancing Florestan in the third act pas de trois of  The Sleeping Beauty in the company's opening gala in New York in October 1949. The first new role he created was The Great Admirer of Mademoiselle Piquant in John Cranko's ballet Children's Corner (1948). He appeared in the British film Tread Softly, in 1950. Then followed his Sherlock Holmes and Professor Moriarty in Margaret Dale's The Great Detective (1953); and  Moondog, in Cranko's The Lady and the Fool, (1954)

Despite his rise within the company, MacMillan became unhappy as a performer. He suffered from severe stage fright, and his leading roles became an ordeal for him. De Valois gave him three months' leave of absence, during which he spent some time dancing with his friend John Cranko's small group in the little Kenton Theatre, away from the spotlight, in Henley-on-Thames. Cranko, himself a former dancer who had moved to choreography, concluded that MacMillan might well follow the same course. When MacMillan returned to work, his confidence as a dancer somewhat restored, he took part in de Valois' new Choreographers Group, set up in response to Marie Rambert's "Ballet Workshops". For this group, MacMillan choreographed his first ballet, Somnambulism, which was first given on 1 February 1953. It was well received, and the next year he followed with another small-scale work, Laiderette. This introduced the "outsider" character that became a hallmark of his ballets, in this case a female clown who attends a ball at which her host falls in love with her until she loses the mask that has made her attractive. MacMillan's eclectic choice of music was evidenced in these two early works; the first was danced to jazz composed by Stan Kenton, and the second was to the harpsichord music of Frank Martin.

On the strength of the workshop successes, de Valois commissioned the 25-year-old MacMillan to create a ballet for performance at Sadler's Wells. Danses concertantes, to music by Stravinsky, was first produced in January 1955, with designs by Nicholas Georgiadis, with whom MacMillan collaborated extensively over the next years. Parry counts among MacMillan's early influences the modernism of choreographers such as Roland Petit, Jerome Robbins and Antony Tudor, and the craftsmanship of Ashton, from whom MacMillan said he learned how a ballet was made. The Times commented that with this piece it was clear that a powerful choreographic talent had arrived. The critic Clement Crisp has described the piece as "a bravura display using a witty, allusive classical vocabulary, remade by a creator who knew the cinema and spoke the movement language of his generation". With the success of Danses concertantes MacMillan concluded that his future lay in choreography rather than dancing. After a fierce argument with de Valois, who wanted him to continue in both capacities, he got his way, and from 1955 his contract with the company (on a slightly reduced salary) was purely as a choreographer. His only Covent Garden appearances as a dancer after that were two performances as an Ugly Step-sister in Cinderella alongside Ashton in 1956.

Choreographer
MacMillan next produced a series of one-act ballets. For the junior company he choreographed House of Birds (1955), based on the Grimm brothers' Jorinde and Joringel, and for Covent Garden he created Noctambules (1956) about a Svengali-like hypnotist. He also worked in television, with Punch and the Child (1954), The Dreamers, a television adaptation of Sonambulism, and Turned Out Proud (1955). In 1956 he took leave of absence to spend five months in New York, working with American Ballet Theatre, choreographing Winter's Eve and Journey for the dramatic ballerina Nora Kaye. For the Covent Garden opera company he staged the Venusberg ballet in Tannhäuser, regarded by some critics as the best part of a disappointing production.

MacMillan was the first of his generation of choreographers to have an entire evening of his works presented by the Sadler's Wells Ballet. In June 1956 his new "divertissement ballet" Solitaire was given in a quadruple bill with Somnambulism, House of Birds and Danses concertantes. His 1958 work, The Burrow, with its menacing echoes of war, oppression and concealment, won praise for venturing into territory seldom explored in ballet. The critic in The Times admitted that its dramatic impact was strong enough "to make one glad when it ends". The work marked the beginning of MacMillan's association with Lynn Seymour, who was his muse for many subsequent ballets. The company had by now been granted a royal charter and was known as the Royal Ballet, with the smaller company based at Sadler's Wells called the Royal Ballet Touring Company.

In the late 1950s MacMillan choreographed two musicals: one for the stage (The World of Paul Slickey, 1958) and one for the cinema (Expresso Bongo, 1959). The Invitation, first shown at the Royal Opera House on 30 December 1960, is probably MacMillan's most controversial ballet. This one-act work about rape was interpreted by Lynn Seymour and Desmond Doyle and provoked, at the time, mixed reactions in the press and the audience. Among MacMillan's works for the Royal Ballet in the early 1960s was The Rite of Spring (1962); he selected an unknown junior dancer, Monica Mason, to dance the lead role of the chosen maiden who dances herself to death in a primitive ritual. Dance and Dancers described it as "a singular and signal triumph"; Mason's performance was judged "brilliantly done ... one of British ballet's most memorable performances". In The Times John Percival commented that ever since Nijinsky's original attempt in 1913 The Rite had been waiting for a choreographer who could make it work on stage, and MacMillan's was the most successful version to date.

In the mid-1960s two of his ballets, though both immensely successful, strained relations between MacMillan and the Royal Opera House management. In 1964 Webster and the Covent Garden board turned down MacMillan's proposal to create a ballet using the music of Mahler's Das Lied von der Erde The Song of the Earth; the decision was made on the grounds that the score was unsuitable for use as a ballet. Cranko, by now in charge of the Stuttgart Ballet, invited MacMillan to create the work there in 1965. It was a huge success, and within six months the Royal Ballet had taken the piece up. MacMillan's first full-length, three-act ballet, Romeo and Juliet (1965), to Prokofiev's score, was choreographed for Seymour and Christopher Gable, but at Webster's insistence the gala premiere was danced by Margot Fonteyn and Rudolf Nureyev. The decision was made for commercial rather than artistic reasons: Fonteyn and Nureyev were internationally known stars and guaranteed a full house at premium prices, as well as huge publicity. In Parry's words, MacMillan and his two chosen dancers felt betrayed.

Berlin, 1966–69
Disillusioned with Covent Garden, MacMillan accepted an invitation from the Deutsche Oper in Berlin to run its ballet company. Parry describes this as an unhappy experience. Though at Covent Garden Webster may sometimes have been suspected of favouring the opera at the expense of the ballet, MacMillan discovered that at the Berlin house there was no doubt that the ballet was given distinctly lower priority. He did not speak German, which reduced his enjoyment from watching films (of which he was a great devotee) and theatre and limited him generally in everyday life. Although he had taken several colleagues with him, including Seymour, many moved away over the course of his nearly four years in charge, and MacMillan became increasingly isolated. It was the first time he had been in a managerial as well as a creative role, and the strain affected his physical and mental health. He smoked and drank heavily and suffered a minor stroke.

For the Berlin company, MacMillan created seven ballets: Valses nobles et sentimentales, Concerto, Anastasia (one act version), The Sleeping Beauty, Olympiad, Cain and Abel and Swan Lake.  The critic Jane Simpson considers that some of MacMillan's finest work was done for Berlin and Stuttgart.

Royal Ballet: director 1970–77
In 1970 Ashton, who had been artistic director of the Royal Ballet since de Valois stepped down in 1963, retired, somewhat reluctantly. Webster retired in the same year and wanted a wholesale change of management to coincide with his own departure. For the opera he arranged the joint directorship of Colin Davis and Peter Hall, and for the ballet he secured MacMillan and John Field as co-directors. Neither of the joint directorships succeeded. Hall did not take up his post, instead moving to run the National Theatre, and Field, who had run the junior Royal Ballet company under de Valois and  Ashton, found the split directorship untenable and left within months to become director of ballet at La Scala, Milan.

MacMillan was in an awkward position. It was widely known that Ashton had been forced out, and many resented it. Company morale was lowered by an announcement, to which MacMillan and Field were party, that the two ballet companies would merge, with numerous job losses. The managerial side of the post was no more congenial to MacMillan than it had been in Berlin, and some felt that his creative work suffered during his seven-year term. His expansion of Anastasia into a three-act version (1971) and the other full-length work from this period, Manon (1974), divided opinion, receiving fiercely adverse reviews as well as laudatory ones. His Joplin ballet Elite Syncopations (1974) and Requiem (1976) were immediately successful and have been regularly revived. The latter was dedicated to the memory of Cranko, who had died suddenly in 1973. It was premiered at Stuttgart, because as with Song of the Earth the Royal Opera House board thought the chosen music – Fauré's Requiem – inappropriate for a ballet. The work was not given at Covent Garden until 1983.

At the age of 42 MacMillan, hitherto unmarried and enigmatic about his personal life, married the 26-year-old Australian painter Deborah Williams. The writer John Percival comments that MacMillan's marriage "saved him, both physically and mentally [and] gave him stability in his private life and seems to have resolved his confused sexuality". There was one daughter of the marriage.

Royal Ballet: principal choreographer 1977–92
After seven years as director of the Royal Ballet, MacMillan resigned in 1977, wishing to concentrate on choreography. He was succeeded as artistic director by Norman Morrice, whose background was the more avant garde Ballet Rambert. MacMillan took up the post of principal choreographer. His fourth full-length ballet, Mayerling (1978), was a dark work, portraying the suicides of the Austrian Crown Prince Rudolf and his young mistress. Parry comments that some scenarios for his new one-act ballets featured similarly dark themes: "a disturbed family in My Brother, My Sisters, a lunatic asylum in Playground; Valley of Shadows ... included scenes in a Nazi concentration camp." Different Drummer (1984) was a balletic version of Georg Büchner's Woyzeck, familiar to Covent Garden audiences from Berg's 1925 opera Wozzeck: all three depict the brutal fate of the downtrodden. Even the lighter of MacMillan's ballets could have their serious side: La fin du jour (1979), to Ravel's Piano Concerto in G, depicts a way of life of the 1930s soon to be shattered by the Second World War, and is described by Crisp as "a requiem for the douceur de vivre of an era".

In the 1980s MacMillan ventured into non-balletic theatre, directing productions of Strindberg's The Dance of Death (Royal Exchange Theatre, Manchester, 1983) and Tennessee Williams's Kingdom of Earth (Hampstead Theatre, 1984). Parry, writing in The Observer, thought that the drama in the first play failed to spring fully to life; Michael Billington of The Guardian praised MacMillan's "immensely detailed, atmospheric production" of the second piece. From 1984 to 1989, while remaining chief choreographer of the Royal Ballet, MacMillan was associate director of the American Ballet Theatre. For that company he staged new works, Wild Boy and Requiem (this time to Andrew Lloyd Webber's music rather than Fauré's), restaged his Romeo and Juliet, and created a new production of The Sleeping Beauty.

Despite a serious heart attack in 1988 MacMillan continued to work intensely. In 1989 he made his first new ballet for Covent Garden for five years, a new version of Britten's The Prince of the Pagodas. The company had never found the original 1956 Cranko version satisfactory, and it was neglected during the composer's lifetime. MacMillan thought the piece could be successfully reworked with some cuts to the score, but the Britten estate refused to allow any alterations. MacMillan reverted to classical ballet for the piece, creating a fairy-tale work far from his accustomed style. The result was not judged among his best works, but it marked the emergence of the 19-year-old Darcey Bussell, whom he picked to dance the young heroine. Along with the former Bolshoi principal dancer Irek Mukhamedov, who joined the Royal Ballet in 1991, Bussell was MacMillan's final important muse. For the two of them he created Winter Dreams (1991), inspired by Chekhov's Three Sisters. Mukhamedov was the brutish male leading character in MacMillan's last ballet, The Judas Tree (1992).

MacMillan died from a heart attack backstage at the Royal Opera House during a performance of Mayerling. Jeremy Isaacs, the general director of the Royal Opera House, announced the death from the stage after the performance and asked the audience to rise and bow their heads and leave the theatre in silence. On the same night the junior company was presenting MacMillan's Romeo and Juliet in Birmingham. MacMillan had nearly finished work on the dances for a new production of Carousel by the National Theatre, which opened at the Lyttelton Theatre six weeks later, with his family and many of his friends in the audience.

Honours and awards
MacMillan was knighted in 1983, and he received honorary degrees from the University of Edinburgh (1976) and the Royal College of Art (1992). His awards include the Evening Standard Ballet Award (1979); Society of West End Theatre Managers Ballet Award, 1980 and 1983; and, posthumously, the Laurence Olivier Award for Best New Dance Production in 1993 for The Judas Tree; the Society of London Theatre Special Award in 1993; and the Tony Award for Best Choreography in 1994 for Carousel.

Choreography

Full-length ballets

Shorter works

Sources: Royal Opera House performance database, Parry, and Kenneth MacMillan website.

Notes, references and sources

Notes

References

Sources

External links
 
 Biographer Jann Parry talking about Kenneth MacMillan's legacy in a video interview
 Archival footage of Julie Kent and Robert Hill performing in Kenneth MacMillan's Manon in 1999 at Jacob's Pillow Dance Festival.

1929 births
1992 deaths
Administrators of The Royal Ballet
Anglo-Scots
Ballet choreographers
 
British expatriates in Germany
Choreographers of The Royal Ballet
Drama Desk Award winners
Knights Bachelor
Laurence Olivier Award winners
People educated at Great Yarmouth Grammar School
People from Dunfermline
Scottish male ballet dancers
Scottish choreographers
Tony Award winners
20th-century ballet dancers